Grenay is the name of two communes in France:
 Grenay, Isère
 Grenay, Pas-de-Calais